Tala may refer to:

Arts and entertainment 

Tala (comics), a fictional character in DC comics
Tala, a 1938 volume of poetry by Gabriela Mistral
Tala (music), a rhythmic pattern in Indian classical music
"Tala" (song), by Sarah Geronimo, 2016
Tālā (musician) (Jasmin Tadjiky, born 1989), London-based musician

Places

Africa 
Tala, Egypt
Tala, Kenya
Thala, Tunisia

Americas 
Tala, Jalisco, Mexico
Tala, Uruguay

Asia 
Tala or Getahovit, Tavush Province, Armenia
Tala Upazila, Khulna Division, Bangladesh
 Tala Union, within Tala Upazila
Tala, Bhutan
Tala, Cyprus
Tala, Iran
Tala, Kolkata, India
Tala, Raigad, India
Tala, Russia
Tala River, in Seram Island, Indonesia

Other uses 
Tala (name), a female given name, and a list of people and fictional characters with the name
Tala (goddess), in Tagalog mythology
Samoan tālā, the currency of Samoa
Celtis tala, or tala, a deciduous tree in South America
Təla (Tala), the seventh month of the Afghan calendar
Tala language, a Chadic language of Nigeria
Tala (Hindu architecture), a main horizontal element of Hindu temples
Tala (rocket), a hybrid propellant rocket developed in the Philippines

See also 
 Talas (disambiguation)
 Thala (disambiguation)
 Talla (disambiguation)
 Talash (disambiguation)
Aşağı Tala, Azerbaijan
Yuxarı Tala, Azerbaijan